The 2021–22 Cape Town Tigers season is the 2nd season in the existence of the Cape Town Tigers. The team played in the BAL qualification and successfully advanced to the 2022 BAL season.

Cape Town began its qualification October 21, 2021 and started its debut season in the BAL on April 10, 2022. The Tigers were led by head coach Relton Booysen.

Roster

Transactions

In

|}

Basketball Africa League qualification

Qualification

|-
!colspan=12 style=""|First round

|-
!colspan=12 style=""|Elite 16
|-

|}

Basketball Africa League

Standings

Games

|-
!colspan=12 style=""|Group phase

|-
!colspan=12 style=""|Playoffs

|}

References

Cape Town Tigers